This is a list of the universities in New Zealand, of which there are eight. Many of the universities are descended from the former University of New Zealand, a collegiate university that existed from 1870 to 1961. In 2013, the universities provided tertiary education to over 180,000 students or 132,553 equivalent full-time students (EFTS).

General information

 * i.  Predecessors established in 1895.

Faculties and colleges 
The top-level divisions (faculties, colleges) of each university can vary widely from university to university. While all universities have faculties of science, for instance, fewer have faculties of education. The table below summarises the faculties and colleges of every university in New Zealand:

International rankings
These three ranking systems are regarded as the most influential and widely observed international university rankings.

According to QS World University Rankings:

According to THE World University Rankings:

According to Academic Ranking of World Universities:

Endowment

See also
Tertiary education in New Zealand
Polytechnics and institutes of technology in New Zealand

References

External links
 No Major Drama - for lists of all majors for bachelor's degrees available from New Zealand universities, grouped in subject areas

 
Universities
New Zealand
Universities in New Zealand
New Zealand